Allando Matheson (born February 29, 1992) is a Jamaican-Canadian soccer player playing with Malvern City FC in the Victorian State League Division 1.

Early career 
Matheson began playing at the youth level with North Scarborough, and eventually in 2008 joined the Toronto FC Academy. He began playing in the Reserve Division of the Canadian Soccer League with the TFC Academy U16 team. In 2009, he was promoted to the top U18 Academy team in the main Canadian Soccer League division, where he finished as the club's top goalscorer with seven goals.

Senior and college career
In 2010, he was selected by Toronto FC to feature in the 2010 Canadian Championship against the Vancouver Whitecaps. He featured as a starter in the match against Vancouver on June 2, 2019, where Toronto drew the match in order to claim the Canadian Championship.

In 2011, he decided to play college soccer with the University of Connecticut, where he played for four seasons.

In 2015, he played abroad in the National Premier League with Harbour View F.C.

After a season abroad he returned home to play in League1 Ontario with Master's Futbol.

In 2017, he signed with Casey Comets FC playing abroad for the second time in the Victorian State League Division 1 for two seasons in Australia.

In 2019, he signed with Malvern City FC.

Career statistics

Honours

Toronto FC
Canadian Championship (1): 2010

References

External links 
 

1992 births
Living people
Association football forwards
Canadian soccer players
Canadian expatriate soccer players
Canadian people of Jamaican descent
Toronto FC players
Harbour View F.C. players
Canadian Soccer League (1998–present) players
National Premier League players
Sportspeople from Kingston, Jamaica
Master's FA players